Dosti Dushmani  is a 1986 Indian Hindi-language action drama film, produced and directed by T. Rama Rao under the Srinath Productions banner. It stars Jeetendra, Rajinikanth, Rishi Kapoor, Poonam Dhillon, Kimi Katkar and Bhanupriya, with music composed by Laxmikant–Pyarelal. The film was a remake of 1977 Tamil film Chakravarthy which was also remade later in Telugu as Mugguru Mithrulu (1985) and later in Kannada as Brahma Vishnu Maheshwara (1988). It marked Bhanupriya's Bollywood film debut.

Plot
Dr. Sandeep Kumar (Jeetendra), Inspector Ranjith (Rajinikanth) and Advocate Prakash (Rishi Kapoor) have been the best of friends since childhood. The three of them were raised by Sandeep's parents (Pran & Shavukar Janaki), who adopted Prakash as an orphan and took in Ranjith, who was abandoned by his smuggler father Daga (Amrish Puri) for being too honest, fleeing with his mother and sister instead. Ranjith is an honest police officer, Sandeep is a well-known doctor in the city, and Prakash is a leading criminal lawyer. The three of them often come into clashes with Daga, who has become a big gangster and doesn't know that Ranjith is his son. Ranjith and Prakash always quarrel with Sandeep, who has a problem of being very short-tempered, unable to withhold himself if he witnesses injustice being done to someone. One day one of Daga's gang (Guru Bachan) kidnapped and raped Ranjith's pregnant wife Lata (Poonam Dhillon). The incident was witnessed by Sandeep, and he rescued Lata by beating up the rapist. For her protection, Sandeep made Lata promise not to reveal the rape to anyone. Daga took advantage of the situation and killed the rapist, hoping to frame Sandeep as the killer. Ranjith arrested Sandeep and Prakash took up the case in his defence. Sandeep did not reveal what actually happened for Lata's protection, so Prakash stated that Sandeep had committed the crime in order to protect his wife. The wife, a fake brought into the case for Sandeep's defence, was a girl named Rekha (Bhanu Priya), whom Sandeep had protected from the harassment of some gangsters a while ago. All the while, Sandeep fell in love with Rekha and married her. Meanwhile, Prakash also fell in love with a thief girl named Shanthi (Kimi Katkar). Her brother was killed by Daga, who was also putting out a search for her. At the end, Ranjith came to know the truth, he accepted Lata even though she got raped, and he realized Daga is his father. Also, he discovered that Rekha was abandoned to the street by Daga as a child and that she's his sister. At the end, Sandeep, Ranjith, and Prakash joined forces and defeated Daga.

Cast
 Jeetendra as Dr.Sandeep Kumar
 Rajinikanth as Inspector Ranjith
 Rishi Kapoor as Advocate Prakash
 Poonam Dhillon as Lata
 Kimi Katkar as Shanthi
 Bhanupriya as Rekha
 Amrish Puri as Daga
 Pran as Sandeep's Father
 Shavukar Janaki as Sandeep's Mother
 Kader Khan as Nishaan
 Shakti Kapoor as Kamal
 Shafi Inamdar as Police Commissioner
 Asrani as Lawyer
 Guru Bachan as Rowdy

Soundtrack
Lyrics: Anand Bakshi

References

External links 
 

1986 films
1980s Hindi-language films
Films directed by T. Rama Rao
Films scored by Laxmikant–Pyarelal
Hindi remakes of Tamil films
Indian action drama films